Mark LeBar is an American philosopher and professor of philosophy at Florida State University. He is known for his works on moral philosophy and is the editor of Social Theory and Practice since 2015.

Books
 Justice (ed.), Oxford University Press 2018
 Equality and Public Policy, edited with Antony Davies, Cambridge University Press 2015
 The Value of Living Well, Oxford University Press 2013

References

21st-century American philosophers
Philosophy academics
Moral psychologists
Living people
Florida State University faculty
University of Arizona alumni
Year of birth missing (living people)